Flavobacterium arsenitoxidans  is a Gram-negative, arsenite-oxidizing, non-spore-forming, rod-shaped and aerobic bacterium from the genus of Flavobacterium which has been isolated from soil from Suphanburi in Thailand.

References

 

arsenitoxidans
Bacteria described in 2015